O'Hara, U.S. Treasury (on-screen title is O'Hara, United States Treasury) was an American television crime drama starring David Janssen and broadcast by CBS during the 1971-72 television season. Jack Webb's Mark VII Limited packaged the program for Universal Television. Webb and longtime colleague James E. Moser created the show; Leonard B. Kaufman was the producer. The series was produced with the full approval and cooperation of the United States Department of the Treasury.

Synopsis
O'Hara, U.S. Treasury starred Janssen (whose company co-produced the show with Mark VII) as the title character, Treasury Agent Jim O'Hara. A county sheriff from Nebraska whose wife and child died in a fire, O'Hara cut all ties with his past life. He put in an application with the United States Department of the Treasury, which accepted him.

As a "T-Man," O'Hara was available to any of the various law enforcement agencies then part of the Department, all of which cooperated in this positive portrayal of their various organizations, much in the manner of the Los Angeles Police Department with Webb's Dragnet and Adam-12. These included the Secret Service, the Intelligence Unit of the Internal Revenue Service, the then-Alcohol, Tobacco, and Firearms Division of IRS, and the then-Customs Bureau.

O'Hara sometimes worked undercover. Janssen was the series' only regular, as he was given a different assignment at the start of each weekly episode.

Guest stars in the series' brief run included: Bruce Bennett, Godfrey Cambridge, Paul Comi, William Conrad, Yvonne Craig, Gary Crosby, Will Geer, Frank Gorshin, Alan Hale, Jr., Martha Hyer, Marilyn Maxwell, Ricardo Montalbán, Judy Pace, Leslie Parrish, Larry Pennell, Brock Peters, Charles Knox Robinson, Marion Ross, Don Stroud, George Takei, Jessica Tandy, Angel Tompkins, Lindsay Wagner, Betty White, Joseph Wiseman, Lana Wood, and Dana Wynter.

O'Hara marked the first Mark VII show to run a full hour in length; all of Webb's previous efforts (excepting the TV-movie pilot for Dragnet 1967) ran in half-hour episodes. It was also one of the few he did not package for NBC. The show failed to compete in the Nielsen ratings against ABC's The Partridge Family and Room 222 and ended after one season, ranking 48th out of 78 shows with an average 17.1 rating. Reruns were later shown on the A&E Network in the 1990s and on Retro Television Network in the 2000s.

According to Brandon Tartikoff, when Fred Silverman was the head of programming at CBS and considering whether or not to renew O'Hara, he met with a representative of the Treasury Department, who told him, "There are those of us down in Washington who like the idea of a weekly prime-time showcase. So if the show gets cancelled, we're gonna do what we've gotta do." Silverman didn't take the Treasury representative seriously, but according to Tartikoff, after the show was cancelled, "about a dozen top CBS executives on both coasts had their income taxes audited the following year."

Episodes

Award nomination

References
 Brooks, Tim and Marsh, Earle, The Complete Directory to Prime Time Network and Cable TV Shows

External links
 

1971 American television series debuts
1972 American television series endings
CBS original programming
1970s American crime drama television series
English-language television shows
Television series by Mark VII Limited
Television series by Universal Television
Television shows set in Los Angeles